Upton and North Elmsall railway station, was a railway station on the Hull and Barnsley Railway (H&B) in Yorkshire, England. The station served the villages of Upton and North Elmsall, (both now in the Wakefield District of West Yorkshire).

History
Upton and North Elmsall was opened in July 1885 and was closed to passengers in January 1932.

Passenger services were always limited as the line had been built to exploit the South Yorkshire Coalfield, and export the coal through Hull Docks, but part of the Parliamentary approval for the line was conditional on the company providing a passenger service to the communities that the line went through. Bradshaw's timetable from 1906 has seven workings in each direction daily, whereas by 1922, just two services are shown running between Cudworth and Hull Cannon Street.

Although the station closed to regular passenger traffic in 1932, it was still used for rail tours and special traffic such as football excursions until 1954. Closure of the station to goods came in 1959, but the line from the western portal of Barnsdale Tunnel to Cudworth, remained open for colliery traffic until 7 August 1967. The old trackbed in the area is now part of Upton Country Park.

In 1996, a cutting to the east of the station site was designated as a nature reserve.

Heritage site
In June 2020, a proposal was put forward to revamp the site and use it as a heritage railway centre. The proposal also includes laying  of track through the  Barnsdale Tunnel and stopping just short of the A1 road at Barnsdale Bar.

References

Sources

External links
Mapping of the station from 1906
Map of the Hull and Barnsley system
Image of the station in 1961

Disused railway stations in Wakefield
Railway stations in Great Britain opened in 1885
Railway stations in Great Britain closed in 1959
Former Hull and Barnsley Railway stations
railway station